Francisco Sedano Antolín (born 2 December 1979), commonly known as Paco Sedano, is a Spanish retired futsal player who last played for Barcelona as a goalkeeper.

Honours

Club
Coslada
1 promotion to División de Plata (1995–96)

Móstoles
1 División de Plata championship (1999-2000)
1 promotion to División de Honor (1999-2000)
1 Copa Comunidad de Madrid (2004)

Barcelona
3 Spanish futsal leagues (2010–11, 2011–12, 2012–13)
3 Copa de España (2011, 2012, 2013)
1 Copa de S.M. El Rey (2011)
1 UEFA Futsal Cup (2011)

International
 Spain
1 FIFA Futsal World Cup (2004)
2 Futsal Euro (2005, 2016)

Individual
Best player Copa Comunidad de Madrid (2004)

References

External links
LNFS profile
UEFA profile

1979 births
Living people
Futsal goalkeepers
Sportspeople from Madrid
Spanish men's futsal players
FC Barcelona Futsal players